Karl Coleman (born 19 November 1988) is an Irish association football goalkeeper who is currently a free agent. He first played for University College Dublin A. F. C. before making his debut with Shamrock Rovers on 18 April 2008. Karl parted company with The Hoops, by mutual consent, on 31 July 2009 and is currently a free agent.

References

1988 births
Living people
Republic of Ireland association footballers
Shamrock Rovers F.C. players
Association football goalkeepers
League of Ireland players